The Ranks and insignia of Royal Danish Army follows the NATO system of ranks and insignia, as does the rest of the Danish Defence. The ranks are based around German and French military terms.

Current ranks
The current insignia for the Royal Danish Army was introduced along with the introduction of the MultiCam uniform. This sand coloured insignia replaced the older standard green slip-on and all other special slip-ons.

Officers
The highest officer's rank is OF-9 (General) which is reserved for the Chief of Defence (only when this seat is occupied by an army officer). Similarly, OF-8 (Lieutenant general) is reserved for the Vice Chief of Defence). OF-7 (Major general) is used by the Chief of the Royal Danish Army and OF-6 (Brigadegeneral) by the chief of a brigade as well as keepers of high-office positions.

Medical personnel
Insignia used by physicians, dentists and veterinarians.

Other ranks
The rank insignia of non-commissioned officers and enlisted personnel.

Additional ranks

Clerical personnel

Types of rank insignia

Historical ranks

Officer ranks 
In 1801, new uniforms were introduced for the whole army. Along with the new uniforms, epaulette ranks were introduced for officers. Following the defeat in the English Wars in 1812, Denmark was on the brink of financial bankruptcy, resulting in drastic reductions in the military. Therefore, only generals were allowed to wear epaulettes, with other ranks reverting to cuff insignia. In 1822, epaulettes were introduced to all ranks.

Timeline

Other ranks

Timeline

Notes

References 
Citations

References

External links
 Badges of Rank for the Royal Danish Army, 2018
 Badges of Rank for the Royal Danish Army, 2018 (in Danish)

Military ranks of Denmark
Royal Danish Army